Vojkan Miljković (Serbian Cyrillic: Војкан Миљковић; Nickname: "Dybala" , born 4 June 1991, in Požarevac, Serbien) is a Serbian footballer who plays for FC Partizan, Serbien. Parents: Predrag Miljkovic and Branka Miljkovic. Brother: Ivan Miljkovic.

He passed the entire football school of FC "Partizan".

He  was captain of his generation (1991) 3 years long, which featured Adem Ljajić, Marko Šćepović, Miloš Ostojić...

In the youth categories Partizan he played two years for the older generation ‘90, and for the selection of the representation SERBIA where they won the tournament in Malta.

2003 tournament in Arad, Romania also was top scorer.

At the tournament in Florence, Italy, they was champions. At the tournament in Matera, Italy, they was also champions.

2007 as a cadet in the tournament Partizan in Perugia "Renato Curi" they  won second place, where they participated Olympiakos, Torino, Empoli, Genoa, Lazio, Juventus....

2007 VI International Cadet tournament Partizan U16, where teams from Vitesse, Fiorentina and Real Madrid were, he was named MVP of the tournament.

2008 At the Mundialito U17 tournament in Madrid, Spain,  where he scored goals against Barcelona, Real Madrid. They won third place, with the participation of Barcelona, Real Madrid, Espanyol, Lazio, Sao Paulo.

He has played in all national teams of Serbia up to U21, where he was the captain of male young team, pioneers, cadets ...

2009 he have his debut for the first team of Partizan in the championship game against Čukarički when then headcoach Slaviša Jokanović was current coach of Fulham.

External links
 U-19 Serbia -Bosnia Vojkan Miljkovic 2-0
 Vojkan Miljković - Highlights
 Vojkan Miljkovic-Partizan-
 Osvajači duple krune 2008/2009, fudbaleri Partizana sa stručnim štabom
 KADETI PARTIZANA SUVERENI!
 Kadeti Partizana suvereni!
 IGRAJ ILI ĆEŠ DOBITI OTKAZ!

1991 births
Living people
Sportspeople from Požarevac
Serbian footballers
Association football midfielders
FK Partizan players
FK Teleoptik players
FK BSK Borča players
FK Bežanija players
FK Proleter Novi Sad players
FK Jedinstvo Užice players
FK Radnički Beograd players
Serbian SuperLiga players
Serbian First League players
Serbian expatriate footballers
Expatriate footballers in Austria
Expatriate footballers in Germany